30th Anniversary Collection is a compilation album by Paul Anka, released in 1989.

Reception

Allmusic gave the compilation 4.5 stars out of 5 and said, "Not many artists can claim a 20-year run of hits, much less be credited with writing the majority of them as well, but Paul Anka can."

Track listing

References

1989 compilation albums
Paul Anka albums
Rhino Records compilation albums